Shitan railway station is a railway station in Shitan, Zengcheng District, Guangzhou, Guangdong, China. It is a station on the  Guangzhou–Shitan railway and Guangshen Railway. It is managed by the Guangshen Railway Company. It was built in 1911 and is now a level 4 station on the national railway station scale.

References

Railway stations in China opened in 1911
Railway stations in Guangdong
Stations on the Guangzhou–Shenzhen Railway